Chinenye is an Igbo language female given name of Nigeria. It is a contraction of Igbo "chi na-enye" or "chineke na-enye" and literally means "God gives." The name may refer to:
Chinenye Akinlade (born 1980), Nigerian beauty pageant titleholder
Chinenye Fidelis (born 1993), Nigerian female weightlifter 
Chinenye Ndulue (born 1989), Nigerian Researcher at Dalhousie
Chinenye Adaobi Igwegbe (born 1985), Nigerian Female Chemical Researcher

References

African feminine given names
Igbo names